The Patria Institute ("Patria" meaning "Motherland" while also serving as the initials for Pensamiento, Acción y Trabajo para la Inclusión Americana, or "Thought, Action, and Work for American Inclusion" in English), often stylized as PATRIA Institute, is an Argentine think tank headquartered in Buenos Aires, dedicated to the promotion of Latin American thought, to the research of the region's political processes, and to the development of inclusive policies.

History 
The Patria Institute was founded on April 7, 2016. It was officially inaugurated on April 13 through a Facebook message on its official page. It was founded in 2016 by former Argentine president and current Argentine vice-president Cristina Kirchner.

The institute is the political fort of the progressive politician Cristina Fernandez. In 2022, the institute clashed with the Presidency over a loan agreement with the IMF.

Authorities
 Honorary President: Cristina Fernández de Kirchner
 President: Oscar Parrilli
 Vice president: Jorge Ferraresi
 Secretary: Teresa Sellarés
 Treasurer: Adriana Fontana

References

External links
 Official site 

Think tanks
Think tanks based in Argentina
2016 establishments in Argentina
Cristina Fernández de Kirchner